The 16 Word Guideline is a treaty deal between China and Vietnam, signed at 1999 as two countries sought to improve the relationship between China and Vietnam. It was signed between Le Kha Phieu, Vietnamese Communist Party's general secretary and Jiang Zemin, Chinese Communist Party's general secretary.

However, it has been debated whatever how important the Guideline since both Communist Parties of two nations rarely talk about how the deal was signed, as well as how 16 Words look like. It has been kept in secret and any attempt to talk about it would result with suppression in both countries.

Vietnamese nationalists and anti-communists say the treaty guaranteed China to annex Vietnam at 2020, and granted historical distortion by Vietnam's Communist Party, the only sole Party in Vietnam, although it is not proved.

See also
China–Vietnam relations

References

China–Vietnam relations